Chhattisgarh Lokayog is the Parliamentary Ombudsman for the state of Chhattisgarh (India). It is a high level statutory functionary,  created to address grievances of the public against ministers, legislators, administration and public servants in issues related to misuse of power, mal-administration and corruption. It was first formed under the Chhattisgarh Lok Ayog Act, 2002 and approved by the president of India. The passage of Lokpal and Lokayukta's Act, 2013 in Parliament had become law from January 16, 2014 and requires each state to appoint its Lokayukta within a year.  A bench of Lokayukta should consist of judicial and non-judicial members. An Upa-Lokayukta is a deputy to Lokayukta and assists him in his work and acts in-charge Lokayukta in case the position fells vacant before time.

A Lokayukta of the state is appointed to office by the state Governor after consulting the committee consisting of State Chief Minister, Speaker of Legislative Assembly, Leader of Opposition,or leader of largest opposition party in State Legislature, Chairman of Legislative Council and Leader of Opposition of Legislative Council and cannot be removed from office except for reasons specified in the Act and will serve the period of five years.

History and administration 

Chhattisgarh Lokayog Act-2002 was passed in the Chhattisgarh Assembly and was effective from year 2002. As per the Act, the Lokayog will form an authority or authorities who shall investigate the complaints of misconduct by public servants after receipt of complaint by it. The Act makes provision for completion of enquiry within 3 months on a case of corruption referred to the Government by Lokayog. The Act has been passed to create the position as two member institution with Lokayukt Chief being from Judicial background and Lok Ayukt being from bureaucracy. Chhattisgarh LokAyog had introduced a system of penalties against persons filing wrong complaints for cases covered under Chhattisgarh Lok Ayog Act, 2002 after giving them an opportunity of hearing to prove the facts of case. Penalty amount have to be deposited in the Lok Ayog office, Raipur.

In 2013, on a complaint referred by Chhattisgarh Lokayukta, Chhattisgarh Government in 2013 had set up Enquiry Committees to probe corruption allegations against its employees.

Oath or affirmation

Powers 

Chhattisgarh Lokayog has complete and exclusive authority for enquiring into allegations or complaints against the State Chief Minister, State Deputy Chief Minister, Ministers of the state Government, Leader of Opposition and Government officials. The institution has powers to investigate and prosecute any government official or public servants who are covered by the act and abuses his authority for his self interest or causes hurt to anyone or any action done intentionally or following corrupt practices negatively impacting the state or individual.

Appointment and tenure 

Lokayog of Chhattisgarh is Justice TP Sharma who will succeed Justice Shambhu Nath Srivastava, a former retired judge Allahabad High Court and  will head a two member team with a term of five years or reaching of the age of 70 years, whichever is earlier.

Chhattisgarh Lok Ayog Chairperson will be appointed by Governor along with other members  who are recommended by a committee headed by Chief Minister and other members being 
Speaker of Assembly  and Opposition Leader in Assembly, or elected leader of the largest opposition party in the Assembly.

Notable cases 

Chhattisgarh Lokayog after receiving a complaint from the son of a senior BJP leader in a case relating to contract allocation of a major irrigation canal to a private firm based in Hyderabad, had issued notices to state Chief Minister Ajit Jogi and Chief Secretary Arun Kumar along with four Government officials from the state.

In year 2016,Chhattisgarh Lokayog had complaints registered against 20 IAS officers and 2 IFS officers as declared by state Chief Minister in state legislature in response to a question from state Congress Chief.

In 2020, Chhattisgarh Lokayog had a pending case against suspended General Manager Sanjay Singh from Chhattisgarh Tourism Board (CTB) on complaints relating to corruption.

See also 
Lokpal and Lokayukta Act, 2013
Goa Lokayukta
Karnataka Lokayukta
Madhya Pradesh Lokayukta
Gujarat Lokayukta

References

External links 
 Official website

Lokayuktas
Chhattisgarh